Regional elections were held in some regions of Italy during 1978. These included:

Aosta Valley on 25 June
Friuli-Venezia Giulia on 25 June
Trentino-Alto Adige on 19 November

Elections in Italian regions
1978 elections in Italy